"Devastated" is a song by American hip hop recording artist Joey Bada$$. It was released on May 27, 2016 by Pro Era and Cinematic Music Group, as the first single from his album, All-Amerikkkan Bada$$. The song was produced by Powers Pleasant, Kirk Knight and Adam Pallin.

Background and release
Joey first previewed "Devastated" at Coachella on April 16, 2016. In the song Joey discusses his pre-fame problems, and how he was "devastated" because he had not blown up. He shares a resilient message about turning his struggles into a strength.

Music video
The song's accompanying music video was directed by  OG Swank & Shomi Patwary and it was premiered on August 10, 2016, via Joey's YouTube account. Since its release, the video has received over 32 million views.

Charts

Certifications

References

External links
Lyrics of this song at Genius

2016 songs
2016 singles
Joey Badass songs
Songs written by Adam Pallin
Songs written by Joey Badass
Cinematic Music Group singles